Dunedin City Royals is an amateur football club based in Dunedin, New Zealand.

Formed in 2021, originally as South City Royals, the club is an initiative between existing Southern Dunedin based clubs, Caversham, Dunedin Technical, Hereweka Junior football club, and Melchester Rovers Junior football club forming a ‘hub’ where certain activities are conducted under a single team. From the 2022 season, the club changed their name and logo to Dunedin City Royals. The team plays in light blue and white which is said to represent the teams location and "reflected the sea, the sky and the waves."

Dunedin City Royals plays in the FootballSouth Premier League and the Southern League, one of three qualifying leagues for the New Zealand National League.

The club also competes in the Chatham Cup, New Zealand's premier knockout tournaments for men. The team received a bye in the 2021 Chatham Cup for the preliminary round so their first game of the competition was in Round 1 against follow FootballSouth Premier League team Roslyn-Wakari, which South City Royals won 3–1. They next faced another local team Mosgiel in Round 2, needing extra time to beat them 2–1.

References

External links
Facebook
Soccerway profile

Association football clubs in Dunedin
2021 establishments in New Zealand
Association football clubs established in 2021